William Greene III (January 1, 1797 – March 24, 1883) was a lieutenant governor of the state of Rhode Island, serving for two years shortly after the American Civil War.

Life

From a prominent Rhode Island family, Greene was the son of United States Senator and Rhode Island Attorney General Ray Greene and his wife Mary M. Flagg.  Greene was also the grandson of the second governor of the state, William Greene, Jr. who served for several years during the American Revolutionary War, and the great grandson of William Greene, Sr. who served 11 one-year terms as a colonial governor of Rhode Island.  Greene also descends from John Greene, Jr. who served for ten years as deputy governor of the Rhode Island colony, from Warwick founders John Greene, Sr., Samuel Gorton, and Randall Holden, and from Frances (Latham) Dungan, the "mother of governors."

Greene graduated from Brown University and studied law at Litchfield in Connecticut.  Following this he went to Ohio about 1820, and spent more than four decades there, promoting the Cincinnati public schools and roads.  Greene delivered a Phi Beta Kappa Address at Brown in 1851, which supported the Fugitive Slave Act of 1850 and criticized those who violated the law (abolitionists).  He returned to Warwick in 1862, and was selected as Rhode Island's Lieutenant Governor in 1866, under Governor Ambrose Burnside, shortly after the Civil War.  He served for two years.

Greene died in Warwick in 1883 and was buried in the Governor Greene Cemetery where his father, grandfather, and great grandfather are all buried, along with their wives.

Family

Greene was married in 1821 to Abby Bracket Lyman, the daughter of Erastus Lyman, and the couple had two daughters: Catharine Ray Greene (1824-1864) and Anna Jean Greene (1827-1831).  He married second Caroline Brenton Burge.

Sources

Bibliography

Further reading

See also

Ray Greene for his paternal ancestry

External links 
Greene family group

1797 births
1883 deaths
American people of English descent
Brown University alumni
Lieutenant Governors of Rhode Island
Politicians from Cincinnati
Politicians from Warwick, Rhode Island
Burials in Rhode Island
19th-century American politicians
Greene family of Rhode Island